The Interceptor is a British drama television serial that was first broadcast on BBC One from 10 June until 29 July 2015. The eight-part series was written by Tony Saint and made by BBC Drama Productions. The series was cancelled after one series. According to OT Fagbenle who stars as agent Ash, the show was a victim of management change at the BBC.

The series is about a new law enforcement team tasked with hunting down some of Britain's most wanted criminals. The series is inspired by the book of the same name which details the career of former customs agent Cameron Addicott, co-written by Kris Hollington.

Synopsis
Special Agent Marcus "Ash" Ashton (Fagbenle), a HM Revenue and Customs agent and his partner Tommy (Lonsdale) capture a drugs shipper in an operation at London Waterloo station. Whilst his boss is happy with a conviction of 3 kg of cocaine, Ash wants a larger criminal. During the subsequent operation, Tommy is severely injured in a resultant car accident, and Ash is then suspended. Subsequently, approached in a pub by Cartwright (Stewart), the head of top-secret UNIT (Undercover Narcotics Investigation Team), on first entering UNIT's HQ he meets a familiar face, his Customs training officer Valerie (Ashbourne).

Cast
O. T. Fagbenle as Special Agent Marcus "Ash" Ashton, a UK Customs agent
Jo Joyner as Lorna Ashton, Ash's wife
Robert Lonsdale as Tommy, Ash's UK Customs partner and friend
Ewan Stewart as Jack Cartwright, Head of the UNIT team
Lorraine Ashbourne as Valerie, ex-UK Customs, a member of the UNIT team
Anna Skellern as Kim, ex-Met Police Flying Squad, a member of the UNIT team
Charlie De Melo as Martin, ex-MI6, a member of the UNIT team
Valeria Vereau as Sonia the Spanish Interpreter 
Jeany Spark as Detective Inspector Gemmill of the Metropolitan Police, Ash's friend
Trevor Eve as Roach, owner of a legitimate scaffolding business and a noted pillar of society. Head of a criminal organisation that distributes and sells drugs
Gary Beadle as Docker, apparent owner of an electrical contracting business, and a criminal. Roach's right-hand man
Lee Boardman as Michael "Xavier" Duffy, the apparent owner of a dry cleaning shop, and a criminal. Manages the street-based drugs distribution chain
Neal Barry as "Smoke", a criminal and an informant source for Ash
Paul Kaye as James Gordon "Jago" Dalkin, a criminal and enforcer
Michael Lindall as Wark, a criminal
Simon Armstrong as Chief Inspector Stannard. Gemmill's boss, and Cartwright's former colleague/now foe
Dexter Fletcher as "Scooter", a pill producer and dealer
Ralph Ineson as "Yorkie", a Leeds born and bred former criminal, having retired from armed robbery
Ralf Little as Alex, Ash's former school boy best friend, now a minor career criminal
Jack Roth as Casby, a criminal turned violent enforcer
Dean Roberts as Ash's dad

Production
The Interceptor was commissioned by Ben Stephenson and Danny Cohen. The executive producer is Sarah Brown and the producer is Patrick Schweitzer. Filming began in London in March 2014, with David Gyasi cast in the lead role, but he left the production after injuring his leg. With OT Fagbenie recast in the lead role, filming re-commenced in April 2014. Part of the filming took place in Gravesend, at Nell's Cafe, which doubled for a cafe called 'Planet Thanet'. with the UNIT base scenes filmed on location in Keybridge House, a decommissioned British Telecom building in Vauxhall. The Interceptor was the first BBC production which purposefully used only electric powered cars behind the camera, using a fleet of five leased Vauxhall Ampera's.

Background
Cameron Addicott is a retired UK customs officer/SOCA agent. Addicott had joined the Alpha Projects Unit, a group of dedicated undercover Customs officers who hunted the UK's most dangerous criminals. Using telephone and electronically tapped data feeds, the Alpha team would then use the resulting intelligence to prevent serious criminals from committing crime, including prevention of murders, stopping large shipments of drugs and other organised crime. After retiring in 2008, Addicott began writing his memoirs, with the first part co-written by Kris Hollington and published by Penguin Books in 2010, titled The Interceptor.

Reception
The series received a universally negative response from critics. It was given 1/5 stars by Michael Hogan who, writing in The Telegraph, said "Fagbenle tried his best to inject some life into the limp script – huffing, puffing, pouting and glowering – but he’s too good for this hokum". Adam Postans writing for the Daily Mirror who wrote "This attempt at a gritty crime drama... is a clichéd mess with appalling dialogue,"  and Sally Newell writing for The Independent wrote that the "watchable but predictable prime-time cop drama"  was like "EastEnders on an adrenalin rush, but this contrived cop show lacks heart."

Broadcast
The series premiered in Australia on 12 August 2015 on BBC First.

Episodes

References

External links
 

BBC Media Centre site

2015 British television series debuts
2015 British television series endings
2010s British crime drama television series
BBC television dramas
2010s British television miniseries
English-language television shows
Television shows set in the United Kingdom